Saidowal  is a village in Kapurthala district of Punjab State, India. The village is administrated by a Sarpanch, who is an elected representative.

Demography 
According to the report published by Census India in 2011, Saidowal has 385 houses with the total population of 1,786 persons of which 899 are male and 887 females. Literacy rate of Saidowal is 77.91%, higher than the state average of 75.84%.  The population of children in the age group 0–6 years is 143 which is 8.01% of the total population. Child sex ratio is approximately 959, higher than the state average of 846.

Population data

References

External links
  Villages in Kapurthala
 Kapurthala Villages List

Villages in Kapurthala district